The Trials of Van Occupanther is the second studio album by American rock band Midlake. It was released on July 25, 2006, on Bella Union.

It was reissued on its 10th anniversary in 2016 with new cover art, photographs, and two unreleased songs.

The first track on the album, “Roscoe”, was released as a single and is one of the band's signature songs. It was listed as number 90 in Rolling Stone magazine's 100 Greatest Songs of the 2000s.

Track listings

Personnel
 Tim Smith – vocals, piano, keyboard, acoustic guitar, electric guitar, flute
 Eric Pulido – electric guitar, acoustic guitar, 12-string acoustic guitar, keyboards, backing vocals
 Eric Nichelson – keyboards, piano, acoustic guitar, 12-string acoustic guitar, electric guitar
 Paul Alexander – bass, double bass, electric guitar, keyboards, piano, bassoon
 McKenzie Smith – drums, percussion

Additional musicians

 Linda Salisbury – French horn on "Branches" and "Van Occupanther"
 Josh Ello – violin on "Young Bride"

Production notes
 Songs and lyrics by Tim Smith
 Produced by Tim Smith and Midlake
 Engineered and mixed by Paul Alexander and Midlake
 Mastered by Alan Douches at West West Side Music
 Photos by Tim Smith
 Design and layout by Tim Carter and Midlake
 Recorded and mixed in Denton, TX

References

External links 
 "Young Bride" artist commentary

Midlake albums
2006 albums
Bella Union albums